Always Becoming is an artwork created in 2007 by Nora Naranjo-Morse, a Native American potter and poet. The artwork groups five sculptures made with natural materials, which allows them to gradually change over time. The National Museum of the American Indian selected and commissioned the artwork to be exhibited by one of its entrances in 2006.

Description

The sculpture consists of five separate sculptures, that make up a family.

Grounded in figures from Santa Clara Pueblo oral tradition the sculptures are named:
 Father
 Mother
 Little one
 Moon Woman
 Mountain Bird

The sculptures were built in-situ over the summer of 2007. Nora Naranjo-Morse worked with her niece, Athena Swentzell Steen, and her husband, Bill Steen, natural material sculptors, and the family of Don Juan Morales (Tepehuan) from the Mexican state of Durango, as well as many volunteers including museum staff and visitors.

Materials

The sculptures are made entirely of natural materials, including dirt, sand, straw, clay, stone, black locust wood, bamboo, grass, and yam vines. These natural materials were selected to take on a life of their own, allowing the sculptures to change over time. In this way the materials ensure the forms are 'always becoming'.

Dimensions

The five sculptures range in size from 7 feet 6 inches tall (~2.29 meters) to 16 feet (~4.84 meters) tall.

History and Location

On May 24, 2006, the National Museum of the American Indian announced that Naranjo-Morse had won its outdoor sculpture design competition. "Always Becoming" was selected unanimously from more than 55 entries submitted by Native artists from throughout the Western Hemisphere.

During the summer of 2007, on the grounds of the National Museum of the American Indian, Washington, DC, Naranjo-Morse built a family of clay sculptures. The commissioned work is located on the 'Native landscape' at the museum's south entrance on Maryland Avenue S.W. near 4th Street and Independence Avenue S.W., Washington, D.C. The opening of these public works took place on September 1, 2007.

The sculptures are intended to disintegrate over time. The lives of the sculptures, from creation until they have decayed, are being documented by filmmaker Dax Thomas (Laguna/Acoma). As the sculptures disintegrate, the films of their lives will form a more permanent record of their existence and are therefore an essential part of the artistic process and the work itself.

See also
 List of public art in Washington, D.C., Ward 2
 Sculpture

References

External links
Always Becoming Official Website at the National Museum of the American Indian
Always Becoming blog
 NMAI Announcement of Always Becoming as the winner of the Outdoor sculpture Design Competition
 indianz.com Announcement of the NMAI’s outdoor Sculpture Design Competition Winner
 Canelo Project
 Smithsonian Institution ‘Native Networks’
 Native Networks entry for Dax Thomas (Laguna/Acoma) the film maker making the film of the project
 Nora Naranjo-Morse entry on Native Networks
 Tanasi Journal
 Voice of America News: "Five New Sculptures Welcome Visitors to American Indian Museum"
 Follow.xt.pl: Blog entries about the videos by Dax Thomas
 Go Smithsonian
 Home Sweet Farm: Cultivating Stewardship, Growing Righteous Food (blog): Always Becoming
 Southwestern Association for Indian Arts: Board of Directors ‘Nora Naranjo-Morse’ Biography
 Smithsonian Magazine Article: Sculpting Her Vision. By Nicole Wroten 'Smithsonian.com' October 31, 2007
 Dig your Hands in the Dirt: Making Art of the Earth Together (Blog) Friday, February 8, 2008 Always Becoming – Story and photos (except where noted) by Bill Steen

American contemporary art
Outdoor sculptures in Washington, D.C.
2007 sculptures
Sculptures of the Smithsonian Institution
Contemporary works of art
Digital art
Native Americans in Washington, D.C.
Pueblo art
Preservation (library and archival science)
Southwest Federal Center
National Museum of the American Indian